Daulat Ki Jung : War of Wealth is a 1992 Hindi-language action adventure romance film starring Aamir Khan, Juhi Chawla in lead roles, along with Paresh Rawal, Dalip Tahil, Kiran Kumar, Kader Khan in supporting roles. The film was a box office failure.

Synopsis
The film is 'inspired' from the Hollywood classic Mackenna's Gold.
This film is based on a treasure hunt. Bhushan Chaudhry (Shafi Inamdar) and Mr. Agarwal (Tiku Talsania) are business rivals, and hate each other. Their children, Rajesh Chaudhry (Aamir Khan) and Asha Agarwal (Juhi Chawla) study in the same class in college, and are in love with each other. Both are terrified of what their parents will do when they find out about their romance. And when the parents do find out, all kinds of restrictions are placed on them. Unable to stay away from each other, they elope in a stolen car. On the way, they come across an injured man, and decide to take him to hospital. The young couple become mixed up with two rival groups of crooks who are after treasure in a tribal village set in a remote forest somewhere off Mumbai. Rajesh who has a photographic memory, gets hold of the treasure map, and after a quick survey eats it up in order to protect himself and Asha. They are closely followed by their irate parents who do not want them to marry each other. They get caught in the tribal village and is released in an almost miraculous manner. In the end the two lovers are united and the crooks are killed by a CBI officer who was in disguise.

Cast
 Aamir Khan as Rajesh Chaudhry
 Juhi Chawla as Asha Agarwal
 Paresh Rawal as Hari Bhai
 Dalip Tahil as Mike
 Kiran Kumar as Rana
 Kader Khan as CID Inspector Sher Khan / K.K. Topji
 Shafi Inamdar as Bhushan Chaudhry
 Tiku Talsania as Mr. Agarwal 
 Viju Khote as Inspector Godbole
 Mehmood Jr. as Chhotu
 Ram Sethi as Auctioneer 
 B. M. Vyas as Guruji of Tribal Leader

Soundtrack
Music: Anand-Milind | Lyrics: Majrroh Sultanpuri wrote the songs.

References

External links

1992 films
Films scored by Anand–Milind
1990s Hindi-language films